Michael David Poryes (born March 22, 1955) is an American television producer, screenwriter and filmmaker, best known for co-creating the Disney Channel shows That's So Raven and Hannah Montana.

Filmography

Executive producer
Hannah Montana: The Movie (2009)
Wesley Knarr (2009)
That's So Raven (2003–2007)
Hannah Montana (2006–2011)
Life with Boys (2011–2013)
Ethan Is Awesome (2006–2015, Season 10–19 Only)

He also worked as executive story editor in Saved by the Bell.

Creator
That's So Raven (2003–2007)
Hannah Montana (2006–2011)
Life with Boys (2011–2013)
Palak Pe Jhalak (2015)
Raven's Home (2017–present)

References

External links

1955 births
Television producers from California
Showrunners
Writers from Los Angeles
Living people
American male screenwriters
Screenwriters from California